Eddie Newman may refer to:
Eddy Newman (born 1953), former member of the European Parliament
Eddie Newman (horse racing), Supreme Novices' Hurdle
Eddie Newman, political aide, List of John McCain presidential campaign staff members, 2008

See also
Edward Newman (disambiguation)